Radvanec is a municipality and village in Česká Lípa District in the Liberec Region of the Czech Republic. It has about 300 inhabitants.

Administrative parts
The village of Maxov is an administrative part of Radvanec.

References

Villages in Česká Lípa District